The Newport Dodgers were a Northeast Arkansas League baseball team based in Newport, Arkansas, USA that played from 1936 to 1941. They were affiliated with the St. Louis Cardinals from 1936 to 1937, the Detroit Tigers in 1939 and the Brooklyn Dodgers in 1940–1941. They played their home games at Mann Field. The Newport Pearl Diggers began Northeast Arkansas League play in 1909.

Pete Reiser and Johnny Sain are the only two known major leaguers to play for the team when it was known as the Cardinals.

Year-by-year record

References

External links
Baseball Reference

Defunct Northeast Arkansas League teams
Brooklyn Dodgers minor league affiliates
St. Louis Cardinals minor league affiliates
Detroit Tigers minor league affiliates
Professional baseball teams in Arkansas
Defunct baseball teams in Arkansas
Baseball teams disestablished in 1941
Baseball teams established in 1940
Newport, Arkansas
Northeast Arkansas League teams